Bryson's Dictionary of Troublesome Words is a book by Bill Bryson, published under several titles since 1984, that catalogues some of the English language's most commonly misused words and phrases in order to demonstrate preferable usage. It helps writers and editors to think about how to make written communication clearer (or, in some cases, at least how to make it immune from pedantic editorial disparagement by avoiding the pedants' trigger points).

It was first published in 1984 with the title The Penguin Dictionary of Troublesome Words in the United Kingdom and with the title The Facts on File Dictionary of Troublesome Words in the United States. It was republished in a revised edition in 1987; and again in the UK in 1997 under the title Troublesome Words. In 2002 it was published as Bryson's Dictionary of Troublesome Words.

As the author states, "This book might more accurately, if less convincingly, have been called A Guide to Everything in English Usage That the Author Wasn't Entirely Clear About Until Quite Recently."  Bryson describes the English language as a valuable entity, with no two experts agreeing on any point of usage, claiming that those guides that do exist for the common user often expect the reader to be familiar with grammatical terms not encountered since (or even at) high school.

Using almost forty standard works on the subject as his guide, Bryson aims to produce a list of difficult English words that is generally readable and informative while also usable as a reference work.

This aim is accomplished using a large degree of humour as well as a willingness to hold the experts he quotes up to the light for their own failings, thus illustrating how easy it is to make errors of usage, or at least to fail to adhere to preferable or optimal usage.

Like all other major usage advice books, it reflects the language epistemology of professional editors, which is not completely coincident with that of linguistic scientists. It makes use of both linguistic prescription and linguistic description, attempting to avoid the pathological extremes of prescription (valueless pedantry such as hypercorrection) while also making use of its helpful side (which encourages critical thinking).

References

Books by Bill Bryson
English language
English dictionaries